Cheena Kottaram or China Palace is a rest house that was constructed in 1904 for Sri Mulam Tirunal Rama Varma, the then-King of Travancore. The palace was completed along with the commissioning of Quilon-Madras rail line. It is a single-storied, red-brick building with seven rooms. The architecture of Cheena Kottaram is Indo-Saracenic—generally a blend of Indian architecture, European, Islamic, and Moorish architecture. Cheena Kottaram is yet to get the 'National Heritage Monument' accreditation.

Etymology
Kollamites called this rest house Cheena Kottaram (China Palace) because of its resemblance to the ancient Chinese buildings.

History
Before the independence of India, the commercial capital of Travancore kingdom was Quilon (Kollam) - The city with maximum business & commercial reputation in the Travancore-Malabar Coast, with high level of export-import operations through the flourishing Quilon Port. Kollam was known as Palace City that time as there were so many palaces in the city then. One and only airport in the Travancore-Malabar Coast was situated at Kollam city then. During that time, there were no rail-air connectivity to Thiruvananthapuram. Kings of Travancore used to travel from Kollam. For that, they have built the Cheena Kottaram, close to the Quilon Junction railway station.

References

Palaces in Kollam
Tourist attractions in Kollam